Lawrence Doe (born 3 September 1986) is a Liberian-born naturalized Equatoguinean professional footballer who plays for Spanish club CD Monte Sión.

Club career
Before becoming a professional player, Lawrence played for various clubs in Mali at the junior levels like Stade Malien, Djoliba Athletic Club and AS Sigui where he won the Malien League in 2002 with Stade Malien and Malien Cup with Djoliba Athletic Club in 2003.

Lawrence began his professional career with Renacimiento FC in 2005. He played in forty-eight league matches for the Equatoguinean club. He won the Equatoguinean League with the club in 2005, 2006 and 2007.

In 2007, he moved to Spain, where he played for several clubs in the lower leagues, the highest ranked being Águilas CF in the Segunda División B.

After spending a long three-seasons spell in Spain, he moved to Oman where he signed a contract with first-division club Bahla Club.

In the same season, he came back to Spain and signed a contract with CA Pulpileño.

In 2011, he came back to Oman and signed a contract with Oman Elite League club Al-Shabab Club and helped the club to win the 2011–12 Oman Elite League.

He also spent a brief spell in Greece with Platanias scoring two goals in seven league matches and Apollon Smyrni where he played for the club in two matches. In the same season, he moved to Saudi Arabia where he signed a contract with Al Raed of the Saudi Professional League for whom he scored one goal in one match.

Just after one game for Al-Raed, on 30 July 2013 he came back to Oman and signed a contract with one of his former clubs, Al-Shabab Club. He scored one league goal in twenty five league matches for the Oman Professional League club in the 2013–14 Oman Professional League.

In August 2017, Doe signed with Indian I-League club Shillong Lajong. He also appeared in 2018 Indian Super Cup, in which their campaign was ended in quarter-finals.

International career
When Doe played in Mali for Stade Malien, he met with Izetta Sombo Wesley, president of the Liberia Football Association who was in Bamako with the national team in the 2002 Africa Cup of Nations. They exchanged telephone numbers, but finally Doe was never called by Liberia. In 2005, he transferred to Renacimiento and accepted to play for the Equatorial Guinea, then coached by Brazilian Antônio Dumas.
With his adopted nation, Doe appeared in the 2006 CEMAC Cup, the 2008 Africa Cup of Nations qualification and the 2010 FIFA World Cup qualification (except against South Africa in Malabo).
Also, he appeared in B matches against Brazilian side Cruzeiro Esporte Clube and the regional team of Pará de Minas in 2005, the Region of Murcia and Extremadura in 2007, and at the Mundialito de la Inmigración y la Solidaridad in 2009.

In 2011, Doe scored against French club RSC Montreuil, Brittany, France U-20, OGC Nice and the National Union of Professional Footballers.

Honours

Club
With Stade Malien
Malien League (1): 2002

With Djoliba
Malien Cup (1): 2003

With Renacimiento
Equatoguinean League (3): 2005, 2006, 2007

With Al-Shabab
Omani League (0): 2011–12

Country
CEMAC Cup: 2006

References

External links
 
 
 Player Info at Goalzz.com
 
 Futbolme profile  
 Trecera player profile

1986 births
Living people
Sportspeople from Monrovia
Liberian emigrants to Equatorial Guinea
Naturalized citizens of Equatorial Guinea
Equatoguinean footballers
Equatorial Guinea international footballers
Equatoguinean expatriate footballers
Association football defenders
2012 Africa Cup of Nations players
Stade Malien players
Djoliba AC players
Renacimiento FC players
Bahla Club players
Al-Shabab SC (Seeb) players
Apollon Smyrnis F.C. players
ENPPI SC players
Al-Raed FC players
Saudi Professional League players
Expatriate footballers in Mali
Equatoguinean expatriate sportspeople in Mali
Expatriate footballers in Spain
Equatoguinean expatriate sportspeople in Spain
Expatriate footballers in Oman
Equatoguinean expatriate sportspeople in Oman
Expatriate footballers in Greece
Equatoguinean expatriate sportspeople in Greece
Expatriate footballers in Egypt
Equatoguinean expatriate sportspeople in Egypt
Expatriate footballers in Saudi Arabia
Equatoguinean expatriate sportspeople in Saudi Arabia
Deportivo Mongomo players
Liberian footballers
Liberian expatriate footballers
Liberian expatriate sportspeople in Mali
Liberian expatriate sportspeople in Spain
Liberian expatriate sportspeople in Oman
Liberian expatriate sportspeople in Greece
Liberian expatriate sportspeople in Egypt
Liberian expatriate sportspeople in India
Equatoguinean expatriate sportspeople in India